Woronichinia is a genus of cyanobacteria, belonging to the family Coelosphaeriaceae.

The genus was described in 1933 by Alexander Elenkin and is named after the Russian microbiologist N. N. Woronichin (1882—1956).

The genus is native to Europe and Northern America.

Species:
 Woronichinia botrys (Skuja) Komárek & Hindák, 1988
 Woronichinia compacta (Lemmermann) Komárek & Hindák, 1988
 Woronichinia delicatula (Skuja) Komárek & Hindák, 1988
 Woronichinia elorantae Komárek & Komárková-Legnerová, 1992
 Woronichinia fremyi (Komárek) Komárek & Hindák, 1988
 Woronichinia fusca (Skuja) Komárek & Hindák, 1988
 Woronichinia karelica Komárek & Komárková-Legnerová, 1992
 Woronichinia klingiae Komárek & Komárková-Legnerová, 1992
 Woronichinia kuseliae M.Watanabe & Komárek, 1994
 Woronichinia meiocystis Joosten, 2006
 Woronichinia microcystoides (Komárek) Joosten, 2006
 Woronichinia naegeliana (Unger) Elenkin, 1933
 Woronichinia obtusa Joosten, 2006
 Woronichinia problematica Joosten, 2006
 Woronichinia radians (Hortobágyi) Komárek & Hindák, 1988
 Woronichinia robusta (Skuja) Komárek & Hindák, 1988
 Woronichinia tenera (Skuja) Komárek & Hindák, 1988

References

External links

Synechococcales
Cyanobacteria genera